The Superior Court of Los Angeles County is the California Superior Court located in Los Angeles County. It is the largest single unified trial court in the United States.  

The Superior Court operates 37 courthouses throughout the county. Currently, the Presiding Judge is Samantha P. Jessner and David W. Slayton is the Executive Officer/Clerk of Court. They, together with 583 judicial officers and 4,800 employees, operate the nearly 600 courtrooms throughout the county, with an annual budget of over $1 billion.

History

When California declared its statehood in 1849 and became a part of the United States, the first California Constitution authorized the legislature to establish municipal and such other courts as it deemed necessary. The 1851 California Judiciary Act divided the state into districts, placing Los Angeles, San Bernardino, and San Diego counties into one district. Each district had its own court, below which were County and then Justice of the Peace Courts.  Judge Agustín Olvera of the County Court and Judge Jonathan R. Scott of the Justice of the Peace Court were the first judges of these lower courts. Almost immediately the District Court system was burdened by the vast expanse of the district. District Judges were required to hold court proceedings where the cases were filed. Because of the distance District Court Judges had to travel to conduct trials and the sudden growth in population due to the California Gold Rush, the District Court system became ineffective and non-responsive to the needs of its constituency.

In 1879 California adopted a new constitution and with it a revised court system. The District Courts became appeals courts below the State Supreme Court. To take over the District Courts original function, the county Superior Courts were created. The new Superior Court of Los Angeles County began with two judges: Ygnacio Sepulveda and Volney E. Howard. In 1905, juvenile delinquency and dependency hearings were put under the Superior Court's jurisdiction, as were mental health hearings in 1914. Eventually the Superior Court's jurisdiction came to include all civil, felony criminal, family law, juvenile delinquency and dependency, and probate cases in the county.

Throughout its history the Superior Court had had a close relation with the county's many Municipal Courts. By 1971 the Superior Court assumed responsibility for coordinating, providing and scheduling court interpreters for all courts in the County and by 1973 the Court had implemented a county wide system to process the payment of court appointed attorneys. The following year, 1974, all jury services in the county had been consolidated. In 1986 county-wide uniform criminal Local Court rules and uniform exhibit processing procedures were adopted to ensure consistency in how criminal cases were handled through the court system. By 1988 the Municipal and Superior Courts began to cross-assign cases to ease the county's judicial backlog. In 1993 the Superior Court adopted the Municipal Courts' automated criminal case processing system; known as the Municipal Court Information it was rebranded the Trial Court Information System. Also in 1993 the Superior Court was administratively unified with several of the Municipal Courts. And by 1999 17 more Municipal Courts had joined. Finally on January 22, 2000, in accordance with Proposition 220 passed in 1998, the Judges of the Municipal and Superior Courts voted to merge into the Superior Court of California, County of Los Angeles.

Courthouses

General
 Alhambra Courthouse, First Street and Commonwealth Avenue
 Airport Courthouse, 105 and 405 freeway intersection
 Catalina Courthouse, Catalina Island, smallest, one part-time courtroom
 Bellflower Courthouse
 Beverly Hills Courthouse
 Burbank Courthouse
 Chatsworth Courthouse
 Compton Courthouse
 Downey Courthouse
 East Los Angeles Courthouse
 El Monte Courthouse
 Glendale Courthouse
 Hollywood Courthouse
 Huntington Park Courthouse
 Inglewood Courthouse
 Long Beach Courthouse
 Malibu Courthouse
 Metropolitan Courthouse
 Michael D. Antonovich Antelope Valley Courthouse
 Norwalk Courthouse
 Pasadena Courthouse
 Pomona Courthouse North
 Pomona Courthouse South
 Redondo Beach Courthouse
 San Fernando Courthouse
 San Pedro Courthouse
 San Pedro Courthouse Annex
 Santa Clarita Courthouse
 Santa Monica Courthouse
 Stanley Mosk Courthouse, Downtown Los Angeles, 100 courtrooms, largest courthouse in the United States
 Torrance Courthouse
 Van Nuys Courthouse East
 Van Nuys Courthouse West
 West Covina Courthouse
 West Los Angeles Courthouse
 Whittier Courthouse

Specialty
 Alfred J. McCourtney Juvenile Justice Center
 Central Arraignment Court
 Central Civil West Courthouse
 Clara Shortridge Foltz Criminal Justice Center
 David V. Kenyon Juvenile Justice Center
 Eastlake Juvenile Court
 Edmund D. Edelman Children's Court
 Inglewood Juvenile Courthouse
 Los Padrinos Juvenile Courthouse
 Mental Health Courthouse
 Sylmar Juvenile Courthouse

Administration
The Court uses the California Court Case Management System (CCMS) v3, and exposes services to the public such as the Criminal Defendant Index, Civil Party Name Search, Civil Case Document Images, Traffic Ticket Online Services, e-File Small Claims, and Divorce Judgment Documents. The difference between CCMS and these other services is similar to the difference between the federal CM/ECF and PACER systems.

The Court has nearly 4,800 employees, operates nearly 600 courtrooms throughout the county, and has an annual budget of $1 billion. The Court has 2.7 million new cases each year:
 1.7 million traffic tickets
 About 500,000 criminal cases
 Nearly 120,000 family law cases
 Over 150,000 civil lawsuits

Pursuant to California Government Code and the California Rules of Court, the Los Angeles County Superior Court has adopted Local Rules for its government and the government of its officers. The Presiding Judge assigns cases to departments and judges to departments. Nominations and election of the Presiding and Assistant Presiding Judge are made by all judges and take place between September and October of each year. All departments are divided into several principal divisions under the policy and procedures established by its supervising judge, subject to the approval of the Executive Committee and the Presiding Judge.

Officers
There are several officers of the court, including judges, jurors, commissioners, prosecutors, defense attorneys, clerks, bailiffs, and court reporters.

Jurors
 3.1 million of the County's residents are called for jury duty each year
 1 million people became qualified jurors
 Between 7,000 to 10,000 people serve as jurors every day
 Over 5,500 jury trials are held each year
 Average length of a trial is about 7 days
 $15 per day and 34 cents per miles (one way) compensation after the first day
 18 years of age or older, citizen of the United States and a resident of Los Angeles County are minimum requirements

Judges
The state Administrative Office of the Courts maintains an official roster of all superior court judges, including the 431 judges of the L.A. Superior Court. Notable judges:

 Lee Smalley Edmon, Presiding Judge
 William Atwell Cheney
 David S. Cunningham, III
 James Hahn
 Shirley Hufstedler
 Lance Ito
   
 Joyce Karlin
 Charles "Tim" McCoy

 Loren Miller Jr.
 Loren Miller (1903–1967)
 Billy G. Mills
 Lawrence Mira
 Michael T. Sauer
 Robert Mitsuhiro Takasugi (1930–2009)
 Joseph Wapner

Commissioners
A commissioner is a subordinate judicial officer elected by the judges of the Court and given the power to hear and make decisions in certain kinds of legal matters, similar to the United States magistrate judge. Their jurisdiction includes, but is not limited to, traffic matters, family law and juvenile cases, criminal misdemeanors, and criminal felony cases through the preliminary hearing stage. There are 140 commissioners.

Prosecutors
The Los Angeles County District Attorney, currently George Gascón, prosecutes crimes before the court on behalf of California, Los Angeles County, and all cities and special districts within Los Angeles County.

Public Defenders
The Los Angeles County Public Defender, currently Ricardo Garcia, is the public defender.
http://pd.co.la.ca.us/

Clerks
The court clerks, or Judicial Assistants, are responsible for managing the courtrooms and other clerical courtroom activities, interacting with the attorneys and the public, administering oaths, assisting with the impaneling juries, and are responsible for the inventory and safe-keeping of the exhibits. The current, and soon to be retired Clerk, is John A. Clarke.

Bailiffs
The functions of the bailiff are carried out by Los Angeles County Sheriff, currently Alex Villanueva, under contract.

Notable cases
 Hillside Strangler
 Charles Manson murders
 O. J. Simpson murder case
 The Onion Field
 Paul v. Clinton
 Phil Spector murder of Lana Clarkson
 Lee Marvin palimony case
 Trial of Conrad Murray (Michael Jackson's last doctor)

See also
 Superior Courts of California
 Santa Clara County Superior Court
 Sacramento County Superior Court
 Alameda County Superior Court

References

Sources

External links
Official website

Los Angeles
Superior Court